Henry Anthony Minton Sr. (1883–1948) was an American architect based in San Francisco who designed a number of buildings, primarily in the San Francisco Bay Area.

Career
After graduating from Harvard University with an S.B. in architecture in 1905, Minton joined the office of Kendall, Taylor and Stephens in Boston. Within a year, he moved to San Francisco following the 1906 San Francisco Earthquake. As he wrote in 1925, "The San Francisco earthquake resulted in the publication in the newspapers of the crying need of architects in San Francisco.  After due deliberation of at least six out of the ten hours granted to applicants, I became one of the party of twenty argonauts who left Boston for the West, and here I have remained." In San Francisco, Minton joined the firm of Dodge and Dolliver as draftsman and later became an architect for the City of San Francisco Department of Public Works.  He left the Department of Public Works in about 1913 to found his own practice where he worked until his death in 1948. The practice was continued by his son, John G. Minton.

The architectural records and papers from Henry A. Minton and John G. Minton are archived at the Avery Architecture and Fine Arts Library at Columbia University.

Works
Two of Minton's most important clients were the Bank of Italy (now Bank of America) and the Archdiocese of San Francisco.
Works (listed with Pacific Coast Architecture Database (PCAD) building number where applicable) include:

 Frank Albert Leal Theater and Office Building, Fremont, California (PCAD 23400), 1923
 Bank of Italy office, San Jose. (PCAD 21615), 1925 (tallest building between San Francisco and Los Angeles until 1970)
 Bank of Italy Branch, Salinas (PCAD 7804), 1927
 Bank of Italy Branch, Merced (PCAD 7708), 1928
 Saint Brigid's Church Convent, San Francisco, CA (PCAD 7817), 1930
 Bank of Italy Branch, San Mateo, California  (PCAD 7886), 1931
 René C. Davidson Courthouse for Alameda County, with fellow architects William Corlett, James Plachek, William Schirmer, and Carl Werner, Oakland, California, 1934
 Cathedral of the Annunciation, Stockton, California, 1942
 Cobb House, Alameda, California (PCAD 23399)
 Liberty Bank Building, Mission Street Branch.  San Francisco, CA. (PCAD 7803)
 Moccasin Creek Power House, Moccasin, California.  According to one historian, "Although architectural perfection is not usually associated with powerhouses, this 285-foot-long building designed by architect H.A. Minton came close."
 Saint Aloysius Church.  Palo Alto, CA.   Currently the Ananda Church of Self-Realization.
 Saint Cecelia's Church Parochial Residence.  San Francisco, CA (PCAD 7816)
 J. W. Speyer House.  Oakland, CA (PCAD 23398)
 Superior Court of California, Courthouse # 4.  Oakland, CA (PCAD 1026)

References 

1883 births
1948 deaths
Architects from San Francisco
Harvard University alumni
20th-century American architects